Amir Ishemgulov (22 May 1960 – 29 October 2020) was a Russian biologist and politician of Bashkir ethnicity, Doctor of Biological Sciences, professor.

Early life and education
Ishemgulov was born on 22 May 1960, in Bashkortostan, RSFSR, Soviet Union.

He was a distant relative of the writer Zainab Biisheva. She took part in his upbringing. He was ethnically Bashkir. In 1984, he graduated with honors from the Bashkortostan Institute of Agricultural Sciences.

Career
He was the chairman of the executive committee of the World Qoroltai of the Bashkirs, and Director General of the Research Center for Beekeeping and Apitherapy of The Republic of Bashkortostan. He also is a member of the State Assembly of the Republic of Bashkortostan and a Member of the Petrovskaya Academy of Sciences and Arts.

Since 1998, the Director of the Research Center for Beekeeping and Apitherapy of The Republic of Bashkortostan, he has initiated the creation of the center. In 2005, Ishemgulov defended his doctoral dissertation and earned the degree of Doktor nauk and in 2006 he received the title of Professor. Currently he is a professor in his alma mater, now known as Bashkir State Agrarian University.

In 2012, he was a candidate for Corresponding Member of the Academy of Sciences of the Republic of Bashkortostan.

He was elected to the State Assembly of the Republic of Bashkortostan in 2013, Member of the Party "United Russia".

He was a Honored Man of agriculture of Republic Bashkortostan.

Later life and death
He was married and had a daughter. On 29 October 2020, Ishemgulov died after a long illness at the age of 60.

References

External links
 The World Qoroltai of the Bashkirs (in Russian)
 State Assembly of the Republic of Bashkortostan (in Russian)

1960 births
2020 deaths
People from Kugarchinsky District
Russian biologists
Bashkir scientists
Russian beekeepers
Apitherapists
United Russia politicians
Honoured Scientists of the Russian Federation
Russian professors
20th-century Russian scientists
20th-century biologists
21st-century Russian scientists
21st-century biologists